Wrabness railway station is on the Mayflower Line, a branch of the Great Eastern Main Line in the East of England, serving the village of Wrabness, Essex. Its three-letter station code is WRB.

The station is currently managed by Abellio Greater Anglia, which also operates all trains serving the station.

History
Platform 1 (London bound) and platform 2 (Harwich bound) have an operational length for four-coach trains. There were formerly sidings at the west (London) end of both the "up" and "down" lines. Those on the up side were used for local goods work, coal being one of the commodities handled. The sidings on the down side were extended during World War II to the riverside to accommodate a large rail-mounted gun which was intended to protect the estuary.

The signal box controlling the section of line stood at the west end of the down platform but was no longer used after the electrification of the line in 1985. The box was purchased by local enthusiasts and donated to the Colne Valley Railway at Castle Hedingham where it was re-commissioned and is operational today controlling a running round loop.

Services
 the typical weekday off-peak service on the line is one train per hour in each direction, although some additional services run at peak times. There is also one direct train a day on Monday to Fridays from Wrabness to Ipswich (continuing on to Cambridge) during the morning peak, which is operated by a diesel unit.

References

Railway stations in Essex
DfT Category F1 stations
Railway stations in Great Britain opened in 1854
Former Great Eastern Railway stations
Greater Anglia franchise railway stations
Tendring